Jackhammer (Matthew Banham) is a fictional character appearing in American comic books published by Marvel Comics.

Publication history
Jackhammer was first mentioned as a HYDRA leader in Daredevil #121; he first appeared in Daredevil #123 (July 1975) and was created by Tony Isabella and Bob Brown.

The character subsequently appears in Captain America #371 (June 1990), #373-378 (July–October 1990), Guardians of the Galaxy #28-29 (September–October 1992), Captain America #412-414 (February–April 1993), Thunderbolts #24-25 (March–April 1999), and Union Jack #1-2 (November–December 2006).

Fictional character biography
Jackhammer is a costumed agent/division leader of HYDRA when it was under the leadership of the crime lord Silvermane. When they arranged a kidnapping of Foggy Nelson, Daredevil, Black Widow, and S.H.I.E.L.D. pursued them. Jackhammer was among those who fought Daredevil and was defeated.

Jackhammer later left HYDRA and gained superhuman strength from a treatment at Power Broker, Inc. and started a relationship with female wrestler Poundcakes whose rebuff threatened the first date of Captain America and Diamondback. Anaconda and Asp rendered Jackhammer and Poundcake unconscious.

Dr. Karl Malus of Power Broker, Inc. formed Power Tools with Jackhammer and other villains in their plot to capture Battlestar and other characters when they de-powered them. He was among the villains that fought Captain America.

Jackhammer left Power Tools once when there was an occasion that Doctor Octopus recruited him to join his incarnation of the Masters of Evil during the Infinity War. He was among the villains that turned on Doctor Octopus causing him to take flight.

He would participate in an attack on the Thames Tunnel, threatening many civilians inside. He was swiftly defeated by the superhero Union Jack.

Powers and abilities
Originally, Jackhammer is an accomplished engineer and inventor, who wears devices similar to the Shocker's vibro-shock gauntlets. They increase the concussive force of his blows by generating pulsed vibrations on contact. Now, he received immense physical attributes due to the Power Broker treatment, but it somewhat diminished his mind.

References

External links
 Jackhammer at Marvel.com

Comics characters introduced in 1975
Fictional characters with superhuman durability or invulnerability
Fictional engineers
Fictional inventors
Fictional mercenaries in comics
Hydra (comics) agents
Marvel Comics characters who can move at superhuman speeds
Marvel Comics characters with superhuman strength
Marvel Comics mutates
Marvel Comics supervillains